Maureen Reichert (born 11 March 1934) is a Zimbabwean sports shooter. She competed in the mixed 50 metre free pistol event at the 1980 Summer Olympics.

References

External links
 

1934 births
Living people
Zimbabwean female sport shooters
Olympic shooters of Zimbabwe
Shooters at the 1980 Summer Olympics
Place of birth missing (living people)